A tote bag is a large and often unfastened bag with parallel handles that emerge from the sides of its pouch.

Totes are often used as reusable shopping bags. The archetypal tote bag is made of sturdy cloth, perhaps with thick leather at its handles or bottom; leather versions often have a pebbled surface. Common fabrics include canvas, jute, nylon and other easy-care synthetics, which have become common, although these may degrade with prolonged exposure to sunlight. Many low-cost totes are often made from recycled matter, from minimally-processed natural fibers, or from byproducts of processes that refine organic materials.

Etymology
The word tote is a colloquial English term (originally North American) meaning "to carry" or "to transport", generally in relation to a heavy load or burden. It is first recorded in Virginia in 1677, but its etymology is uncertain. An alleged African origin has been discredited. It may be related to Low German  ("bag"), cognate with German  ("bag").

The term "tote bag" is first recorded in 1900.

Environmental concerns

Recently, tote bags have been sold as a more eco-friendly replacement for disposable plastic bags, given they can be reused multiple times. They have also been given away as promotional items. A study by the UK Environment Agency found that cotton canvas bags have to be reused at least 131 times before they can match the carbon expenditure of a single disposable plastic bag, and up to 327 times if the plastic bags are used as bin liners. Another 2018 study by the Danish Environmental Protection Agency found that cotton bags would need to be used 7,100 times to neutralize their environmental impact. Meanwhile, tote bags made from recycled polypropylene plastic require 11 (up to 26 when considering reuse as bin liners for plastic bags) reuses to match.

A 2014 study of U.S. consumers found that the 28% of respondents who own reusable bags forgot them on approximately 40% of their grocery trips and used the bags only about 15 times each before discarding them. About half of this group typically chose to use plastic bags over reusable ones, despite owning reusable bags and recognizing their benefits. An increasing number of jurisdictions have mandated the phase-out of lightweight plastic bags to reduce land and ocean pollution. In order to provide an incentive for consumers to remember reusable bags more often these laws establish a minimum price for bags at checkout and require either paper, reusable fabric tote bags, or thick reusable plastic bags.

References

External links

Further reading 
 

Bags